Carl Robert Johnston (born 29 May 2002) is a Northern Irish professional footballer who plays as a midfielder for  side Fleetwood Town.

Club career
After spending seven years with the academy of Linfield, Johnston joined Fleetwood Town's academy in 2018.

In January 2020, Johnston signed his first professional contract with Fleetwood Town. In June 2020, he was one of 33 players to receive the League Football Education’s 'The 11' award.

Johnson made his senior debut for the club on 1 September 2020 as a second-half substitute in a 3–1 EFL Trophy victory away to Carlisle United. He joined Farsley Celtic on a four-week-long youth loan in October 2020. On 7 January 2021, it was announced that Johnston would remain on loan at Farsley Celtic until the end of the 2020/21 season. On 15 January 2021, he signed a new contract with the club lasting until summer 2022, with the option of a further year. Johnston signed a new long-term contract in June 2022, keeping him at the club for a further three years with the option for a fourth.

International career
He has played for Northern Ireland at under-17 level.

Career statistics

References

External links
 

2002 births
Living people
Association footballers from Northern Ireland
Northern Ireland youth international footballers
Association football midfielders
Linfield F.C. players
Fleetwood Town F.C. players
Farsley Celtic F.C. players
English Football League players
National League (English football) players